Slow Freight is an album by pianist Ray Bryant released by Cadet Records in 1967.

Track listing 
 "Slow Freight" (Ray Bryant, Esmond Edwards) – 9:41
 "Amen" (Donald Byrd) – 4:51
 "Satin Doll" (Duke Ellington) – 6:50
 "If You Go Away" (Jacques Brel, Rod McKuen) – 4:55
 "Ah, the Apple Tree (When the World Was Young)" (Philippe-Gérard, Johnny Mercer) – 3:30
 "The Return of the Prodigal Son" (Harold Ousley) – 5:03
 "The Fox Stalker" (Bryant) – 3:32

Personnel 
Ray Bryant – piano
Art Farmer, Snooky Young – trumpet, flugelhorn
Richard Davis – bass
Freddie Waits – drums

References 

1967 albums
Ray Bryant albums
Cadet Records albums
Albums produced by Esmond Edwards